

TAI Flight 307 was a scheduled flight operated by Transports Aériens Intercontinentaux (TAI) between France and the Ivory Coast via Mali operated by a Douglas DC-7C. On 24 September 1959, the aircraft crashed during its departure from Bordeaux–Mérignac Airport, France when it flew into trees. All of the flight crew and 45 of the 56 passengers on board were killed; the other 11 passengers were seriously injured.

Accident
The DC-7C arrived at Bordeaux from Paris, making a scheduled stop on its route to West Africa. Following a two-hour stopover, departure from Bordeaux took place at 22:33 GMT. Weather at the time of departure was a  wind and light drizzle that did not significantly restrict visibility.

The aircraft cut a swath through the forest; some of the passengers were thrown clear of the wreckage as the fuselage broke up, before being destroyed in a post-crash fire. Twelve survivors were taken to a hospital in Bordeaux; one later died despite medical care, bringing the total number of deaths caused by the crash to 54.

Aircraft
The aircraft involved in the accident, registered F-BIAP, was a Douglas DC-7C airliner powered by four Wright R-3350-30W radial piston engines. Delivered new to Transports Aériens Intercontinentaux on 9 November 1957, it carried manufacturer's serial number 45366.

Probable cause
The Investigation Board appointed to determine the cause of the crash reported that the accident was most likely caused by a combination of factors. Evidence from a reconstructed flight showed that with an increase in speed for a few seconds, the rate of climb of the aircraft will decrease; with a lack of visual references "a pilot may follow a line of flight that will bring the aircraft back near the ground if, during this period, optimum climbing speed is not maintained and the altimeter is not carefully watched".

References
Citations

Bibliography

External links
  Rapport final de la commission d'enquete sur l'accident survenu, le 24 septembre 2959, a Bordeaux-Merignac, a l'avion DC 7 F-BIAP de la Compagnie T. A. I. - Posted at the website of the BEA (France), see profile

Accidents and incidents involving the Douglas DC-7
Aviation accidents and incidents in 1959
Aviation accidents and incidents in France
Transports Aériens Intercontinentaux accidents and incidents
1959 in France